is an island in Japan located between Honshū and Kyūshū, and accessible via ferry from .

Name
It is famous for the duel between Miyamoto Musashi and Sasaki Kojirō. The small island was named for its boat-like appearance, and later came to be called after the Ganryū kenjutsu school Kojirō had founded.

Features
On the island are a few monuments as well as facilities for public gatherings such as an annual tug-of-war. Along the west coast is a walking path.

Industry
The western half of the island is currently being used by Mitsubishi Heavy Industries as a storage facility for its ship manufacturing and drydocks in Shimonoseki across the harbor.

Sports hosting
New Japan Pro-Wrestling held two matches on the island. On October 4, 1987, Antonio Inoki defeated Masa Saito. On December 18, 1991, Hiroshi Hase defeated Tiger Jeet Singh.

References

Islands of Yamaguchi Prefecture
Tourist attractions in Yamaguchi Prefecture